Darrin Dewitt Henson (born May 5, 1973) is an American choreographer, dancer, actor, director and producer. Hensen was a brief member of freestyle music group Trilogy and was featured on their single "Good Time". Henson attended Prep for Prep, a non-profit organization whose vision is to prepare New York City's top minority students for success in education and in life. Newly married to Taurey Winter Bingham.

Career
Henson is known for his instructional dance video Darrin's Dance Grooves (which was heavily marketed in 2001 and 2002), and is perhaps best known for his portrayal of Lem Van Adams from 2000 until 2004 in the Showtime TV series Soul Food, the longest-running drama with a predominantly African-American cast in television history.  Henson was twice nominated for the NAACP Image Award for Outstanding Supporting Actor in a Drama Series, in 2004 and 2005, for his portrayal as the struggling young husband and father in this series.

He has choreographed music videos and concerts for such popular music artists as New Kids on the Block, Jordan Knight, Britney Spears, Backstreet Boys, Hi-Five, 98 Degrees, NSYNC and The Spice Girls.  He is the winner of the 2000 MTV Video Music Award for Best Choreography for "Bye Bye Bye" by NSYNC.

In 2003, Henson directed the film Violation, and starred in the 2007 motion picture Stomp the Yard.

In February 2011, Henson co-starred in the Gospel Music Channel's debut of John Ruffin's stage play The Ideal Husband, which also stars Jackée Harry, Ginuwine, Clifton Powell, Shirley Murdock, Shanti Lowry and Erica Hubbard.

In April 2011, the straight-to-DVD film The Inheritance was released. Henson co-stars in the horror/thriller along with Golden Brooks, D.B. Woodside, Keith David and Rochelle Aytes. In 2014, he was on the show Being Mary Jane.

Henson is currently starring in the BET drama series The Family Business  in the role of Orlando Duncan. He was also interviewed by director Maria Soccor for the upcoming documentary Freestyle Music: The Legacy, which is currently in production.

Filmography

Film

Television

Awards

References

External links
 

1973 births
Living people
African-American male actors
American choreographers
American male film actors
American male television actors
Male actors from New York City
People from the Bronx
20th-century American male actors
21st-century American male actors
21st-century African-American people
20th-century African-American people